Rogério Rodrigues da Silva (born 14 March 1984, in Americana) is a Brazilian footballer who plays for Uberlândia as a centre back.

Career
Rogério began his footballing career on Cruzeiro's youth categories. He then failed to make a single appearance for the club, and was eventually loaned to lower clubs.

In 2008, Rogério signed a contract with Uberaba. After three years with Uberaba, he then signed with Uberlândia.

Later in the same year, Rogério signed a contract with Portuguesa.

Honours

Portuguesa
Série B: 2011
Campeonato Paulista Série A2: 2013

Joinville
Série B: 2014

References

External links

1984 births
Living people
Brazilian footballers
Cruzeiro Esporte Clube players
Associação Portuguesa de Desportos players
Criciúma Esporte Clube players
Joinville Esporte Clube players
Campeonato Brasileiro Série A players
Campeonato Brasileiro Série B players
Association football defenders